Tavşantepe is an underground station of the M4 line of the Istanbul Metro. Located under beneath the D.100 state highway in the Doğu neighborhood of Pendik, Istanbul, it was opened on 10 October 2016 along with the  expansion from Kartal to Pendik.

Station Layout
{|table border=0 cellspacing=0 cellpadding=3
|style="border-top:solid 1px gray;border-bottom:solid 1px gray;" width=50 rowspan=3 valign=top|PPlatform level
|style="border-top:solid 1px gray;" width=100|Westbound
|style="border-top:solid 1px gray;" width=400|←  toward Kadıköy
|-
|style="border-top:solid 2px black;border-right:solid 2px black;border-left:solid 2px black;border-bottom:solid 2px black;text-align:center;" colspan=2|
|-
|style="border-bottom:solid 1px gray;"|Eastbound
|style="border-bottom:solid 1px gray;"| toward Sabiha Gökçen Havalimanı

References

Railway stations opened in 2016
Istanbul metro stations
Pendik
2016 establishments in Turkey